Perminov, female form Perminova, is a Russian surname.

Notable people
Notable people having this surname include:
 Aleksei Yuryevich Perminov (born 1968), Russian footballer
 Anatoly Perminov (born 1945), Russian rocket scientist
 Dmitry Perminov (born 1979), Russian soldier and politician

References

Russian-language surnames